Jorge Cristian Córdoba (born December 12, 1987) is an Argentine professional footballer who currently plays for Deportes Valdivia as a forward.

Career
Córdoba started his professional career in 2008, at the Nacional B (second division) club Unión de Santa Fe. In January 2009, he was loaned to River Plate, in Uruguay, until June 30, 2010, with a buying option.
He scored his first professional goal on May 16, 2009, in a league game against Peñarol.

Honours
Arsenal
Argentine Primera División (1): 2012 Clausura

References

External links
 
 Profile on bdfa.com

1987 births
Living people
Footballers from Santa Fe, Argentina
Argentine footballers
Argentine expatriate footballers
Association football forwards
Unión de Santa Fe footballers
Club Atlético River Plate (Montevideo) players
S.D. Quito footballers
Club de Gimnasia y Esgrima La Plata footballers
Arsenal de Sarandí footballers
Godoy Cruz Antonio Tomba footballers
Defensa y Justicia footballers
Club Atlético Sarmiento footballers
Club Atlético Los Andes footballers
Juventud Unida Universitario players
Club Atlético Douglas Haig players
Villa Dálmine footballers
Dorados de Sinaloa footballers
Correcaminos UAT footballers
Deportes Valdivia footballers
Argentine Primera División players
Primera Nacional players
Ascenso MX players
Uruguayan Primera División players
Ecuadorian Serie A players
Primera B de Chile players
Argentine expatriate sportspeople in Mexico
Expatriate footballers in Mexico
Argentine expatriate sportspeople in Ecuador
Expatriate footballers in Ecuador
Argentine expatriate sportspeople in Uruguay
Expatriate footballers in Uruguay
Argentine expatriate sportspeople in Chile
Expatriate footballers in Chile